Snowville Christian Church, also known as Cypress Grove Christian Church, is a historic Christian Church (Disciples of Christ) church complex located in Snowville, Pulaski County, Virginia. It was built in 1864, and is a one-story, gable-roofed frame church building. The building measures 40 feet by 60 feet. It features pattern-book Greek Revival style columns and pilasters and the principal facade is topped by an octagonal bell tower.

It was added to the National Register of Historic Places in 1987.

References

Churches on the National Register of Historic Places in Virginia
Christian Church (Disciples of Christ) congregations
National Register of Historic Places in Pulaski County, Virginia
Churches completed in 1864
19th-century churches in the United States
Churches in Pulaski County, Virginia